Franklin Burroughs may refer to:

 Franklin Burroughs (businessman) (1834–1897), American entrepreneur who co-founded the Burroughs and Collins company
 Franklin Burroughs (author), American author of non-fiction